Gilles Valere Jacque Elseneer (born 6 March 1978 in Brussels) is a retired professional tennis player from Belgium. He is mostly known for his grass court game, and has achieved his best results on this surface, including a quarterfinal appearance at 's-Hertogenbosch in 2001.

Tennis career

Pro tour
He reached his career-high singles ranking of world No. 97 in July 2004. This was arguably the strongest year of his career, in which he reached the second rounds of the French Open (l. to Gustavo Kuerten) and Wimbledon (l. to Ivo Karlović), and won the challengers of Heilbronn and Sarajevo.

Elseneer made a claim in September 2007 that he was offered money to throw a match against Potito Starace at Wimbledon 2005.

Coaching
He is now coaching and teaching tennis within his father's tennis academy (royal tennis club de Belgique) in Brussels.

ATP Challenger and ITF Futures finals

Singles: 9 (6–3)

Doubles: 13 (8–5)

Performance timeline

Singles

References 
Notes

Sources

External links
 
 

1978 births
Living people
Belgian male tennis players
Sportspeople from Brussels
Belgian tennis coaches
21st-century Belgian people